Anna Asheshov (born 8 July 1941) is a British alpine skier. She competed in the women's downhill at the 1964 Winter Olympics.

References

1941 births
Living people
British female alpine skiers
Olympic alpine skiers of Great Britain
Alpine skiers at the 1964 Winter Olympics
Sportspeople from London